The 1923 Rock Island Independents season was their fourth in the league. The team failed to improve on their previous output of 4–2–1, winning only two games. They finished twelfth in the league.

Schedule

Standings

References

Rock Island Independents seasons
Rock Island Independents
Rock Island